Erminio Dones (14 April 1887 – 25 April 1945) was an Italian rower who competed in the 1920 Summer Olympics.

In 1920 he won the silver medal with his partner Pietro Annoni in the double sculls event.

He was killed towards the end of World War II.

References

External links
 
 
 
 

1887 births
1945 deaths
Sportspeople from Venice
Italian male rowers
Olympic rowers of Italy
Olympic silver medalists for Italy
Rowers at the 1920 Summer Olympics
Olympic medalists in rowing
Medalists at the 1920 Summer Olympics
Italian military personnel killed in World War II
European Rowing Championships medalists